Weoley Castle is a residential suburban district in south-west Birmingham, England. The area is part of the Weoley local authority electoral ward, and also comes under the Northfield local council constituency.  The suburb of Weoley Castle is bordered by Selly Oak to the east, Harborne to the north, Bartley Green to the west, and Weoley Hill and Shenley Fields to the south.

Weoley Castle Square
Weoley Castle Square is a shopping area at the heart of Weoley Castle.  It includes a very large traffic island and during the 1950s prefabricated bungalows of a type known locally as 'prefabs' were on this central island. Today Birmingham City Council maintains the island as a recreation area with benches trees and mown grass.  Round the recreation area are a health centre, shops selling economically priced goods and a market. Shops have also been there since at least the 1930s.

Toponymy

The area takes its name from the ruins of a moated and fortified manor house, now owned by Birmingham Museum & Art Gallery. The castle ruins are a Grade II listed building, and the site became a Scheduled Ancient Monument in 1934. The castle's individual name is from the Old English "Wēo-lēah" meaning "temple clearing". Before the Christian era there may have been a heathen temple here.

Between 1960 and 1961 excavations took place at Weoley Castle which unearthed a 13th-century wooden building. The substantial stone remains and the moat can be seen from the viewing platform which is open daily. A recent Heritage Lottery, Birmingham City Council and English Heritage funded project has led to consolidation of the ruins and the creation of a community education centre where schools sessions, community meetings and events are held.  The ruins are supported by a volunteer group called the Castle Keepers.

Amenities
Weoley Castle Library located at Weoley Castle Square serves the district.  The library includes a local history section, a Pre-school playgroup, drop in advice from Age UK and councillors' surgeries.

Weoley Castle Museum is a visitor attraction that is also located in the suburb. Weoley Castle Walkway is an area of recreation ground that is located mainly within Selly Oak and Quinton. The Lapal Canal is within the grounds and is maintained by the Lapal Canal Trust

Housing estate
Weoley Castle was mostly developed for council housing during the 1930s, and in 1935 the 10,000th council house in Birmingham was officially opened in Hopstone Road by the later Prime Minister Neville Chamberlain. This made Birmingham the first local authority in Britain to build 10,000 council properties – just 15 years after building its first. The completed Weoley Castle housing estate consisted of nearly 3,000 homes.

Geography

Gallery

See also
St. Gabriel's Church, Weoley Castle
Church of Our Lady and St Rose of Lima, Weoley Castle

References

External links
Weoley Castle Library
A Concise History of Weoley Castle and Northfield
Weoley Castle Community Website

Areas of Birmingham, West Midlands
Northfield Constituency